Communist Party of the Canaries (in Spanish: Partido Comunista de Canarias, PCC), is the federation of the Communist Party of Spain (PCE) in the Canary Islands. The general secretary of PCC is Maria D. Puig Barrios. Its headquarters are in Santa Cruz de Tenerife.

References

External links
PCC website
JC-Canarias website 

Canaries
Political parties in the Canary Islands
Political parties with year of establishment missing